The Tamil Nadu Uniformed Services Recruitment Board (TNUSRB) was constituted by the Government of Tamil Nadu in November 1991 video G.O. Ms. No. 1806, Home (Ser.F) Department, dated 29.11.1991 for the recruitment of personnel for the Uniformed Services like Police, Prison and Fire and Rescue Services.

Organisation

The TNUSRB consists of one Chairman in the rank of Director General of Police, one Member in the rank of Additional Director General of Police, one Member Secretary in the rank of Inspector General of Police one Superintendent of Police, one Legal Adviser, one Senior Administrative Officer, one Deputy Superintendent of Police, one Personal Assistant and 20 other office staffs.

Functions and duties

The Board is entrusted with the responsibility of recruiting personnel to the Police Department, Fire and Rescue Services Department and Prison Department for the following categories:-

Sub Inspectors:

(i) Sub Inspector (AR,TALUK,TSP) (Men & Women)

(ii)Sub Inspector (Technical) (Men & Women)

(iii)Sub Inspector (Finger print) (Men & Women)

Police Constable:

(i) Grade II Police Constables (Men & Women)

(ii) Grade ll  Firemen (Men only)

(iii) Grade II Jail Warders (Men & Women)

See also
 Tamil Nadu Public Service Commission
 Tamil Nadu Forest Uniformed Services Recruitment Committee
 Medical Services Recruitment Board

References

External links
 
  - TNPSC Annual Exam Calendar

State agencies of Tamil Nadu